{{Infobox former subdivision
| native_name            = Vilâyet-i Ṭrabzōn
| common_name            = Trebizond Vilayet
| subdivision            = Vilayet
| nation                 = the Ottoman Empire
| year_start             = 1867
| year_end               = 1922
| event_start            = Vilayet Law
| p1                     = Trebizond Eyalet
| s1                     = Giresun Province
| flag_s1                = Flag of the Ottoman Empire.svg
| s2                     = Gümüşhane Province
| flag_s2                = Flag of the Ottoman Empire.svg
| s3                     = Ordu Province
| flag_s3                = Flag of the Ottoman Empire.svg
| s4                     = Rize Province
| flag_s4                = Flag of the Ottoman Empire.svg
| s5                     = Samsun Province
| flag_s5                = Flag of the Ottoman Empire.svg
| s6                     = Trabzon Province
| flag_s6                = Flag of the Ottoman Empire.svg
| s7                     = Kutais Governorate
| flag_s7                = Flag of Russia.svg
| image_map              = CUINET(1890) 1.036 Vilayet of Trebizond.jpg
| image_map_caption      = The Trebizond Vilayet in 1890
| capital                = Trabzon
| today                  = TurkeyGeorgia
| stat_year1             = Muslim, 1914
}}

The Vilayet of Trebizond was a first-level administrative division (vilayet'') in the north-eastern part of the Ottoman Empire, corresponding to the area along the eastern Black Sea coastline and the interior highland region of the Pontic Alps. 

The accuracy of the population figures ranges from "approximate" to "merely conjectural" depending on the region from which they were gathered.

After the Russian-Turkish War of 1877–1878, the sanjak of Lazistan was established. Rize became the center of the district due to the cession of Batumi, the former centre of the sanjak, to Russia with kaza of Artvin. The salname of the year 1344h/1904-1905 mentioned several Armenian pharmacists. The Vilayet also counted with a considerable Greek population.

During World War I eastern half of vilayet (Kazas of Görele, Vakfıkebir, Akçaabat, Trabzon, Of and Maçka with sanjaks of Lazistan and Gümüşhane) was occupied by Russian troops by summer 1916. It was retaken by Ottomans in 1918.

Demographics 

The Sanjak of Trabzon had a Muslim majority since the 16th century. Western estimates given in the 19th century about the City of Trabzon estimate a Turkish majority.

Census of 1914

Administrative divisions
The vilayet included three sanjaks (four after 1889) and 22 kazas.
Sanjaks of the Vilayet:
 Trabzon Sanjak (Trabzon, Ordu, Giresun, Tirebolu, Görele, Vakfıkebir, Sürmene, Of, Akçaabat, Maçka)
 Gümüşhane Sanjak (Gümüşhane, Kelkit, Şiran, Torul)
 Lazistan Sanjak (Its center was Batumi at first until 1878, later Rize after 1878) (Rize, Atina, Artvin; Sometimes included Of as well)
 Canik Sanjak (Its center was Samsun after 1889) (Samsun, Bafra, Ünye, Fatsa, Çarşamba, Terme)

References

 
Ottoman Pontus
Vilayets of the Ottoman Empire in Anatolia
History of Artvin Province
History of Giresun Province
History of Gümüşhane Province
History of Ordu Province
History of Rize Province
History of Samsun Province
History of Trabzon Province
History of Georgia (country)
1867 establishments in the Ottoman Empire
1922 disestablishments in the Ottoman Empire